Noom is a subscription-based app for tracking a person's food intake and exercise habits. The company is known for its emphasis on behavior change and mental wellness.

App 
When creating an account, the user is asked to record information about physical factors such as weight, height, and age, as well as experiential information such as lifestyle, goals, and obstacles.

Users then log their meals and exercise. In response, the app provides feedback in various ways: algorithmically, from a human coach, from other users, through articles, and through quizzes.

The app has been reviewed by newspapers such as the Chicago Tribune and USA Today; health publications such WebMD; and lifestyle magazines such as Good Housekeeping.

Research 
In 2016, a study published in Scientific Reports and based on data collected from 36,000 Noom users (78% female, 22% male) found that 78% of the users self-reported that they lost weight while using the app. The data were collected from October 2012 to April 2014, and the median number of days the users reported their weight was 267, or approximately 9 months. Only users who recorded their weight at least twice a month for 6 consecutive months were included in the study. The frequency of data input correlated positively with weight loss. There was a significant gender difference, such that male users on average reported a higher starting BMI and a greater weight loss.

In 2017, the Centers for Disease Control and Prevention recognized Noom as a diabetes-prevention program, the first mobile app to achieve this status.

Company 
Noom was founded in 2008 by friends Artem Petakov and Saeju Jeong. Petakov says they wanted to combine technology and psychology. The app launched in 2016. The company is headquartered in New York City.

Petakov, previously a software engineer at Google, is Noom's president; Jeong is the company's chief executive.

In 2020, Noom generated $400 million in revenue. As of April 2021, the company says it employs 3,000 people, 2,700 of whom are coaches.

In 2019, as a result of a partnership with Novo Nordisk, patients taking the diabetes medication Saxenda received free access to Noom for one year.

Criticism 
In August 2020, the Better Business Bureau issued a warning to consumers about Noom's subscription fees. Customers reported finding it difficult to cancel subscriptions following the free trial period, as well as to contact the company to obtain refunds. Noom's CEO said in response that they "take each [complaint] very seriously."

Noom has been criticized for promoting diet culture.

References 

Companies based in New York City
Mobile applications